Arana may refer to:

Places
 Arana Hills, Queensland, a suburb in Moreton Bay Region, Queensland, Australia
 Sierra Arana, a mountain range in the province of Granada, Spain
 Harana/Valle de Arana, a valley and municipality in the southeast of Álava
 Arranah, a village in Jenin Governorate, Palestinian National Authority
 Arana Gulch, in Santa Cruz, California, United States
 Cuevas de la Araña, caves in eastern Spain

Other uses
 Arana (surname)
 Arana language, a member of the Krenak languages
 Arana College, a residential college of the University of Otago
 Arana–Lepredour Treaty, between Argentina and France
 Arana–Southern Treaty, between Argentina and the United Kingdom
 Operation Araña, a Spanish law enforcement operation
 TR Araña, a robot
 Anya Corazon, a Marvel Comics superheroine who formerly went by the codename of Araña but is now known as Spider-Girl
 Roberto Vásquez, a Panamanian professional boxer with the nickname of La Araña

People with the given name Arana
 Arana Taumata (born 1989), New Zealand rugby league player

See also
 Aranäs, the name of at least two locations in southern Sweden
 Araña (Anya Corazon), a comic book superhero